A habitat is the type of natural environment in which a particular species of organism lives.

Habitat may also refer to:

Living environments
Human habitat, a place where humans live, work or play
Habitat 67, a housing complex in Montreal, Quebec, Canada
Space habitat, a space station intended as a permanent settlement
Underwater habitat, a fixed underwater structure in which people can live for extended periods

Arts and media
Habitat (film), a 1997 movie directed by Rene Daalder
Habitat (magazine), an ongoing real-estate magazine founded in 1982
Habitat (video game), a massively multiplayer online role-playing game
Habitat, a Canadian alt pop band made up of duo John O'Regan and Sylvie Smith

Organisations
Habitat (retailer), a British home furnishings brand owned by J Sainsbury plc
Groupe Habitat, an international home furnishings retailer owned by Thierry Le Guénic
Habitat for Humanity, a non-profit organization devoted to building affordable housing
United Nations Human Settlements Programme (UN-HABITAT), a United Nations agency

Other uses
Habitat (horse), an American-bred, British-trained Thoroughbred racehorse
Habitat, a trade name for a positive pressure enclosure used to provide a safe environment for those doing hot work on offshore oil platforms

See also
Habitation (disambiguation)
Microhabitat (film), a 2017 South Korean film